This list of thyreophoran type specimens is a list of fossils that serve as official standard-bearers for inclusion in the species and genera of the dinosaur clade Thyreophora, which includes the armored ankylosaurs and the plate-backed spike-tailed stegosaurs. Type specimens are those that are definitionally members of biological taxa, and additional specimens can only be "referred" to these taxa if an expert deems them sufficiently similar to the type.

The list

See also
List of ornithopod type specimens
List of marginocephalian type specimens
List of Mesozoic theropod type specimens
List of other ornithischian type specimens

Lists of dinosaur specimens
Mesozoic fossil record